Alec William Alfred Stock (30 March 1917 – 16 April 2001) was an English footballer and manager. He briefly managed AS Roma, between long spells at Leyton Orient and Queens Park Rangers. At QPR, he won successive promotions, leading the club to the First Division for the first time, and winning the League Cup. Among managers for whom accurate statistics exist, he is the fourth most experienced manager of all time.

Career
Alec Stock was born in Peasedown St John, Somerset, and played as an inside-forward for Charlton Athletic and Queens Park Rangers before the Second World War and guested for several other clubs during the hostilities. He joined Yeovil Town in 1946.

He came to prominence as the player/manager of Yeovil Town during a historic FA Cup run in 1949. They had thrilling victories over Bury and Sunderland, before losing to Manchester United in the fifth round. He later managed Leyton Orient (1949–1959), AS Roma, Queens Park Rangers (1959–1965) (general manager 1965–1968), Luton Town (1968–1972), Fulham (1972–1976) and AFC Bournemouth (1979–1980). He was also the assistant manager of Arsenal for 53 days during the 1955–56 season and was a director of Queens Park Rangers (1977–1979). He was asked to manage the Third Division South team against the North in 1955–56.

It was perhaps Stock's time as manager of Queens Park Rangers where he is most fondly remembered. It was during his spell in the 1960s that coincided with the development of the club with chairman Jim Gregory. The team enjoyed unprecedented success in 1967 and 1968 winning consecutive promotions with the club reaching the First Division for the first time and becoming the first Third Division team to win the Football League Cup in 1967 beating then First Division West Bromwich Albion 3–2 in a come from behind win. Stock had a focus on youth bringing many of the team through the club's youth system (including Frank Sibley, Tony Hazell, Roger Morgan, Ian Morgan and Mick Leach) as well as blending characters such as Rodney Marsh and Mark Lazarus into the set up.

With internal pressures mounting in the club following the 1967–68 season however, Stock was absent for three months, suffering from asthma. In his book A Little Thing Called Pride, Stock tells how Jim Gregory sacked him in 1968 for being ill, just as he thought he was about to return to the helm and save Rangers from relegation. He later had success with Luton Town who he helped to promotion from the Third Division and also with Fulham when he led them to the 1975 FA Cup Final. He briefly returned to be a Director at Queens Park Rangers in the 1977/8 season.

Ron Manager, a character in BBC comedy sketch show The Fast Show is based on Stock, told by George Best in his autobiography. This was also confirmed by comedy actor Paul Whitehouse, who played Ron Manager, in the documentary, Suits You Sir - The Inside Leg Of The Fast Show.

Managerial Statistics

References

1917 births
2001 deaths
English footballers
English football managers
English expatriate football managers
People from Bath and North East Somerset
Footballers from Somerset
Charlton Athletic F.C. players
Queens Park Rangers F.C. players
Yeovil Town F.C. players
AFC Bournemouth managers
Fulham F.C. managers
A.S. Roma managers
Leyton Orient F.C. managers
Luton Town F.C. managers
Queens Park Rangers F.C. managers
Yeovil Town F.C. managers
Arsenal F.C. non-playing staff
Serie A managers
Expatriate football managers in Italy
English expatriate sportspeople in Italy
Association football forwards